The Sebring 12-Hour Florida International Grand Prix of Endurance for the Alitalia Group took place on 25 March 1961, on the Sebring International Raceway, (Florida, United States).  It was the opening round of the F.I.A. World Sports Car Championship. This was also the second round of the F.I.A. GT Cup.

Report

Entry

A massive total of 74 racing cars were registered for this event, of which 67 arrived for practice. Only these, 65 qualified for, and started the race.

Qualifying

As was the normal for Sebring and because they was no qualifying sessions to set the grid, the starting positions were decided according to engine size with the 4.6 litre Chevrolet Corvette C1 of Don Yenko and Ben Moore being given first place.

Race

Most of the 40,000 spectators expected Phil Hill to win the race in his Ferrari 250 TRI/61, provided the car lasted the distance.

Stirling Moss had a bad start due to his Maserati Tipo 61 having problems starting as the battery was flat. It took the Englishman over six minutes to coax the car into life. However, after driving flat out for two hours, he handed the car over to Graham Hill. During the third hour, the car was withdrawn as it exhaust system fell apart.

After 12 hours of racing, the race was won the Sefac Automobile Ferrari of Phil Hill and Olivier Gendebien, two laps clear of their teammates. Giancarlo Baghetti, Willy Mairesse, Richie Ginther and Wolfgang von Trips. The winning cars, completed 210 laps, covering 1,081.6 miles after 12 hours of racing, averaging a speed of 89.861 mph. The podium was complete by another Ferrari of Pedro Rodríguez (racing driver) and his brother Ricardo who were a further lap behind.

Official Classification

Class Winners are in Bold text.

 Fastest Lap: Stirling Moss, 3:13.2secs (96.894 mph)

Class Winners

Standings after the race

 Note: Only the top five positions are included in this set of standings.

Championship points were awarded for the first six places in each race in the order of 8-6-4-3-2-1. Manufacturers were only awarded points for their highest finishing car with no points awarded for positions filled by additional cars. Only the best 3 results out of the 5 races could be retained by each manufacturer. Points earned but not counted towards the championship totals are listed within brackets in the above table.

References

Further reading

Alec Ulmann. The Sebring Story. Chilton Book Company. ASIN B0006CUAP2.

12 Hours of Sebring
Sebring
Sebring
Sebring
Sebring